The Fairholme Range is a mountain range east of the Bow River valley in the Canadian Rockies. The range is bounded on the west side by the Trans-Canada Highway as it passes through the towns of Exshaw and Canmore, while the northern section of the range extends into Banff National Park to the southern shores of Lake Minnewanka. John Palliser named the range in 1859 after his sister Grace Fairholme, who had married William Fairholme.

Peaks of this range include:

Anû Kathâ Îpa, the last entry in the table above, is the official name as of 2020 of a mountain that previously held a racist and offensive name.

In the spring and summer of 2003, Parks Canada performed a prescribed burn in selected areas of the range in order to reduce fire hazard, manage pine beetle population and increase sheep habitat. In total, 5300 hectares of land were affected.

Further reading

References 

Two-thousanders of Alberta
Ranges of the Canadian Rockies